Se Amar Mon Kereche (English: He/She Stole My Heart) is a 2012 Bengali romantic action film directed by Sohanur Rahman Sohan. The film stars Shakib Khan and Tinni in the lead roles, with Ahmed Sharif, Misha Sawdagor and Alamgir in supporting roles. Se Amar Mon Kereche released on 20 August 2012. This movie is inspired by the American film French Kiss.

Cast
 Shakib Khan
 Srabosti Dutta Tinni
 Alamgir
 Misha Sawdagor
 Ahmed Sharif
 Prabir Mitra
 Rehana Jolly
 Afzal Sharif

Music
Music directed by Showkat Ali Emon, Singers Endru Kishore, Kumar Bishwajit, Rezia Parvin & Kanak Chapa

References

2012 films
Bengali-language Bangladeshi films
2010s romantic action films
Bangladeshi romantic action films
Films scored by Shawkat Ali Emon
2010s Bengali-language films
Bangladeshi remakes of American films
Films directed by Sohanur Rahman Sohan